A constitutional referendum was held in Azerbaijan on 24 August 2002. Voters were asked eight separate questions, all of which were approved with at least 96% voting in favour.

Background
On 22 June 2002 President Heydar Aliyev proposed 39 amendments to 23 articles of the constitution. In accordance with articles 3 and 152, the amendments required a referendum to take place, with a turnout at least 50%.

The proposal was approved by the Constitutional Court on 21 June. On 24 July the Central Election Commission ruled that the 39 amendments would be covered by eight separate questions, despite demands from the opposition that each amendment be voted on separately. On 30 August the Commission made a ruling that absolute voting figures would not be published, only the percentages.

On 29 July the National Assembly voted by 94 to 5 to adopt the amendments.

Proposals

Results

References

2002 referendums
Constitutional referendums in Azerbaijan
2002 in Azerbaijan